Cruso may refer to:

People 
 John Cruso (1592/3–after 1650), English military writer and Roundhead during the English Civil War
 Timothy Cruso (1657–1697), English Presbyterian minister and writer, and the namesake of Robinson Crusoe
 Thalassa Cruso (1909–1997), British-born presenter and author on horticulture

Places 
 Cruso, North Carolina

See also 
 Crusoe (disambiguation)
 Robinson Crusoe (disambiguation)